Pãi Tavyterã is a Guarani language spoken by about 600 Pai Tavytera people in eastern Paraguay, in Amambay, eastern Concepción, eastern San Pedro, and northern Canindeyú Departments. The language has 70% lexical similarity with the Kaiwá language, spoken in Brazil. Among Pai Tavyetera people, language use is shifting towards Guaraní.

The language is written in the Latin script.

Phonology

Vowels 

 Six shortened vowels both oral and nasal are heard as /ĭ ɨ̆ ŭ/ and /ĩ̆ ɨ̃̆ ũ̆/.

Consonants 

 /ʝ/ can also be heard as an affricate .
/b d ʝ ɡ/ may also be prenasalized as [ᵐb, ⁿd, ᶮʝ, ᵑɡ].
 /n/ is heard as  before velar consonants.

Notes

External links
 Paï-Tavytera, Countries and Their Cultures

Languages of Paraguay
Guarani languages